Sarah Margaret Allen (1930–7 January 2017) was a Welsh artist known for her textile and embroidery work which included a number of public commissions.

Biography
Sadie Allen was born in Barry in the Vale of Glamorgan in South Wales between 1945 to 1950. She studied at the Cardiff School of Art where she completed qualifications in book illustration and also received her art teachers diploma. 

After graduation Allen taught at several schools in Hampshire and the north of England. For ten years she was a senior lecturer at Newcastle Polytechnic and was also served as an examiner in Creative Studies for the City & Guilds Board. 

As an artist Allen worked in paint, textiles and embroidery. She regularly exhibited at the National Eisteddfod of Wales in the 1960s and also with the Society of Education through Art. Her textile commissions included a memorial hanging for a church at Dacre in Cumbria, a panel for Carlise Civic Centre and a commemorative piece for the jubilee of the Women's Institute in Cumbria. Allen was a regular speaker at Women's Institute events and also ran courses for the Workers Educational Association. 

In 1981, Allen bought a disused chapel in Hethersgill in Cumbria which became her working studio and an arts and exhibition centre. She held a number of exhibitions with her daughter and her husband, the painter Ceri Allen. 

A solo exhibition of her work was held at the Abbot Hall Art Gallery in 1986 and, as well as Abbot Hall, Reading University and Bangor Normal College hold examples of her work.

References

1930 births
2017 deaths
20th-century Welsh women artists
20th-century women textile artists
20th-century textile artists
21st-century Welsh women artists
21st-century women textile artists
21st-century textile artists
Alumni of Cardiff School of Art and Design
People from Barry, Vale of Glamorgan
British embroiderers